The 1876 United States presidential election was the 23rd quadrennial presidential election, held on Tuesday, November 7, 1876, in which Republican nominee Rutherford B. Hayes faced Democrat Samuel J. Tilden. It was one of the most contentious presidential elections in American history. Its resolution involved negotiations between the Republicans and Democrats, resulting in the Compromise of 1877, and on March 2, 1877, the counting of electoral votes by the House and Senate occurred, confirming Hayes as President. It was the second of five U.S. presidential elections in which the winner did not win a plurality of the national popular vote. This is the only time both major party nominees were incumbent US governors. 

After U.S. President Ulysses S. Grant declined to seek a third term despite previously being expected to do so, U.S. Representative James G. Blaine emerged as the frontrunner for the Republican nomination. However, Blaine was unable to win a majority at the 1876 Republican National Convention, which settled on Governor Hayes of Ohio as a compromise candidate. The 1876 Democratic National Convention nominated Governor Tilden of New York on the second ballot.

The results of the election remain among the most disputed ever. Although it is not disputed that Tilden outpolled Hayes in the popular vote, there were wide allegations of electoral fraud, election violence, and other disfranchisement of predominantly Republican Black voters. After a first count of votes, Tilden had won 184 electoral votes to Hayes's 165, with 20 votes from four states unresolved. In Florida, Louisiana, and South Carolina, both parties reported their candidate to have won the state. In Oregon, one elector was replaced after being declared illegal for having been an "elected or appointed official." The question of who should have been awarded those electoral votes is the source of the continued controversy.

An informal, "back-room" deal was struck to resolve the votes: the Compromise of 1877. In the deal, the Democrats conceded the 20 contested electoral votes to Hayes, resulting in a 185-184 victory; in return, the Republicans agreed to withdraw federal troops from the South, marking the end of Reconstruction.

To date, it remains the election that yielded the highest voter turnout of the eligible voting-age population in American history, at 81.8%. Tilden's 50.9% is the largest share of the popular vote received by a candidate that was not elected to the presidency. This was the only presidential election in US history in which a candidate who received more than 50% of the popular vote did not win the election.

Nominations

Republican Party nomination 

It was widely assumed during the year 1875 that incumbent President Ulysses S. Grant would run for a third term as president despite the poor economic conditions, the numerous political scandals that had developed since he assumed office in 1869, and a longstanding tradition set by George Washington not to stay in office for more than two terms. Grant's inner circle advised him to go for a third term and he almost did so, but on December 15, 1875, the House, by a sweeping 233-18 vote, passed a resolution declaring that the two-term tradition was to prevent a dictatorship. Later that year, Grant ruled himself out of running in 1876. He instead tried to persuade Secretary of State Hamilton Fish to run for the presidency, but the 67-year-old Fish declined since he believed himself too old for that role. Grant nonetheless sent a letter to the convention imploring them to nominate Fish, but the letter was misplaced and never read to the convention. Fish later confirmed that he would have declined the presidential nomination even if it had been offered to him.

When the Sixth Republican National Convention assembled in Cincinnati, Ohio, on June 14, 1876, James G. Blaine appeared to be the presidential nominee. On the first ballot, Blaine was just 100 votes short of a majority. His vote began to slide after the second ballot, however, as many Republicans feared that Blaine could not win the general election. Anti-Blaine delegates could not agree on a candidate until his total rose to 41% on the sixth ballot. Leaders of the reform Republicans met privately and considered alternatives. They chose the reforming Ohio Governor Rutherford B. Hayes, who had been gradually building support during the convention until he finished second on the sixth ballot. On the seventh ballot, Hayes was nominated for president with 384 votes, compared to 351 for Blaine and 21 for Benjamin Bristow. New York Representative William A. Wheeler was nominated for vice president by a much larger margin (366–89) over his chief rival, Frederick Theodore Frelinghuysen, who later served as a member of the Electoral Commission, which awarded the election to Hayes.

{| class="wikitable sortable" style="text-align:center"
|-
! colspan="2" | Vice Presidential Ballot'|-
! Ballot !!1st (Partial Roll-Call)
|-
!Wheeler 
|style="background:#fbb;"|366
|-
!Frelinghuysen 
|style="background:#fdd;"|89
|-
!Jewell 
|style="background:#fee;"|86
|-
!Woodford 
|70
|-
!Hawley 
|25
|-
!Not Called 
|style="background:#d3d3d3"|120
|}

Democratic Party nomination

Democratic candidates:
 Samuel J. Tilden, governor of New York
 Thomas A. Hendricks, governor of Indiana
 Winfield Scott Hancock, United States Army major general from Pennsylvania
 William Allen, former governor of Ohio
 Thomas F. Bayard, U.S. senator from Delaware
 Joel Parker, former governor of New Jersey

The Democratic Party's failure to nominate its own ticket in the previous presidential election, in which they had instead endorsed the Liberal Republican candidacy of Horace Greeley, had resulted in much debate about the party's viability. Any doubts about the party's future were dispelled firstly by the collapse of the Liberal Republicans in the aftermath of that election, and secondly by significant Democratic gains in the 1874 mid-term elections, which saw them take control of the House of Representatives for the first time in sixteen years.

The 12th Democratic National Convention assembled in St. Louis, Missouri, in June 1876, which was the first political convention ever held by one of the major American parties west of the Mississippi River. There were 5000 people jammed the auditorium in St. Louis and hopes for the Democratic Party's first presidential victory in 20 years. The platform called for immediate and sweeping reforms in response to the scandals that had plagued the Grant administration. Tilden won more than 400 votes on the first ballot and the presidential nomination by a landslide on the second.

Tilden defeated Thomas A. Hendricks, Winfield Scott Hancock, William Allen, Thomas F. Bayard, and Joel Parker for the presidential nomination. Tilden overcame strong opposition from "Honest John" Kelly, the leader of New York's Tammany Hall, to obtain the presidential nomination. Thomas Hendricks was nominated for vice president since he was the only person to put forward for that position.

The Democratic platform pledged to replace the corruption of the Grant administration with honest, efficient government and to end "the rapacity of carpetbag tyrannies" in the South. It also called for treaty protection for naturalized United States citizens visiting their homelands, restrictions on Asian immigration, tariff reform, and opposition to land grants for railroads. It has been claimed that the voting Democrats received Tilden's presidential nomination with more enthusiasm than any leader since Andrew Jackson.

Source: Official proceedings of the National Democratic convention, held in St. Louis, Mo., June 27th, 28th and 29th, 1876. (September 3, 2012).

Source: Official proceedings of the National Democratic convention, held in St. Louis, Mo., June 27th, 28th and 29th, 1876. (September 3, 2012).

Source: Official proceedings of the National Democratic convention, held in St. Louis, Mo., June 27th, 28th and 29th, 1876 (September 3, 2012).

Greenback Party nomination

Greenback candidates:
 Peter Cooper, U.S. philanthropist from New York
 Andrew Curtin, former governor of Pennsylvania
 William Allen, former governor of Ohio
 Alexander Campbell, U.S. representative from Illinois

Candidates gallery

The Greenback Party had been organized by agricultural interests in Indianapolis, Indiana, in 1874 to urge the federal government to inflate the economy through the mass issuance of paper money called greenbacks. Its first national nominating convention was held in Indianapolis in the spring of 1876. Peter Cooper was nominated for president with 352 votes to 119 for three other contenders. The convention nominated Anti-Monopolist Senator Newton Booth of California for vice president. After Booth declined to run, the national committee chose Samuel Fenton Cary as his replacement on the ticket.

Prohibition Party nomination

The Prohibition Party, in its second national convention in Cleveland, nominated Green Clay Smith as its presidential candidate and Gideon T. Stewart as its vice presidential candidate.

American National Party nomination
This small political party used several different names, often with different names in different states. It was a continuation of the Anti-Masonic Party that met in 1872 and nominated Charles Francis Adams, Sr., for president. When Adams declined to run, the party did not contest the 1872 election.

The convention was held from June 8 to 10, 1875 in Liberty Hall, Pittsburgh, Pennsylvania. B.T. Roberts of New York served as chairman, and Jonathan Blanchard was the keynote speaker.

The platform supported the Reconstruction Amendments to the Constitution, international arbitration, the reading of the scriptures in public schools, specie payments, justice for Native Americans, abolition of the Electoral College, and prohibition of the sale of alcoholic beverages. It declared the first day of the week to be a day of rest for the United States. The platform opposed secret societies and monopolies.

The convention considered three potential presidential candidates: Charles F. Adams, Jonathan Blanchard, and James B. Walker. When Blanchard declined to run, Walker was unanimously nominated for president. The convention then nominated Donald Kirkpatrick of New York unanimously for vice president.

General election
Campaign

Tilden, who had prosecuted machine politicians in New York and sent the legendary political boss William M. Tweed to jail, ran as a reform candidate against the background of the corruption of the Grant administration. Both parties backed civil service reform. Both sides mounted mudslinging campaigns, with Democratic attacks on Republican corruption being countered by Republicans raising the Civil War issue, a tactic that was ridiculed by Democrats, who called it "waving the bloody shirt." Republicans chanted, "Not every Democrat was a rebel, but every rebel was a Democrat."

Hayes was a virtual unknown outside his home state of Ohio, where he had served two terms as a representative and then two terms as governor. Henry Adams called Hayes "a third-rate nonentity whose only recommendations are that he is obnoxious to no one." Hayes had served in the Civil War with distinction as colonel of the 23rd Ohio Regiment and was wounded several times, which made him marketable to veterans. He had later been brevetted as a major-general. His most important asset was his help to the Republican ticket in carrying Ohio, a crucial swing state. On the other side, the newspaperman John D. Defrees described Tilden as "a very nice, prim, little, withered-up, fidgety old bachelor, about one-hundred and twenty-pounds avoirdupois, who never had a genuine impulse for many nor any affection for woman."

The Democratic strategy for victory in the South was highly reliant on paramilitary groups such as the Red Shirts and the White League. Using the strategy of the Mississippi Plan, the groups actively suppressed both Black and White Republican voter turnouts by disrupting meetings and rallies and even using violence and intimidation. They saw themselves as the military wing of the Democratic Party.

Because it was considered improper for a candidate to pursue the presidency actively, neither Tilden nor Hayes actively stumped as part of the campaign and left that duty to their surrogates.

Colorado
Colorado was admitted to the Union as the 38th state on August 1, 1876; this was the first presidential election in which the state sent electors. There was insufficient time or money to organize a presidential election in the new state. Therefore, Colorado's state legislature selected the state's three Electoral College electors. The Republican Party held a slim majority in the state legislature following a closely contested election on October 3, 1876. Many of the seats in that election had been decided by only a few hundred votes. On November 7, 1876, in a 50 to 24 vote, the state legislature chose Otto Mears, William Hadley, and Herman Beckurts to serve as the state's electors for president. All three of the state electors cast their votes for Hayes. This was the last election in which any state chose electors through its state legislature, rather than by popular vote.

Electoral disputes and Compromise of 1877

Florida (with 4 electoral votes), Louisiana (with 8), and South Carolina (with 7) reported returns that favored Tilden, but the elections in each state were marked by electoral fraud and threats of violence against Republican voters. The most extreme case was in South Carolina, where an impossible 101 percent of all eligible voters in the state had their votes counted, and an estimated 150 Black Republicans were murdered. One of the points of contention revolved around the design of ballots. At the time, parties would print ballots or "tickets" to enable voters to support them in the open ballots. To aid illiterate voters, the parties would print symbols on the tickets, and in this election, many Democratic ballots were printed with the Republican symbol of Abraham Lincoln on them. The Republican-dominated state electoral commissions subsequently rejected enough Democratic votes to award their electoral votes to Hayes.

In two Southern states, the governor recognized by the United States had signed the Republican certificates; the Democratic certificates from Florida were signed by the state attorney-general and the newly-elected Democratic governor. Those from Louisiana were signed by the Democratic gubernatorial candidate and those from South Carolina by no state official. The Tilden electors in South Carolina claimed that they had been chosen by the popular vote although they were rejected by the state election board.

Meanwhile, in Oregon, the vote of a single elector was disputed. The statewide result clearly favored Hayes, but the state's Democratic governor, La Fayette Grover, claimed that one of the Republican electors, Ex-Postmaster John Watts, was ineligible under Article II, Section 1, of the United States Constitution since he had been a "person holding an office of trust or profit under the United States." Grover substituted a Democratic elector in Watts's place.

The two Republican electors dismissed Grover's action and reported three votes for Hayes. However, the Democratic elector, C. A. Cronin, reported one vote for Tilden and two votes for Hayes. The two Republican electors presented a certificate signed by the secretary of state of Oregon, and Cronin and the two electors whom he appointed (Cronin voted for Tilden while his associates voted for Hayes) presented a certificate signed by the governor and attested by the secretary of state.

Ultimately, all three of Oregon's votes were awarded to Hayes, who had a majority of one in the Electoral College. The Democrats claimed fraud, and suppressed excitement pervaded the country. Threats were even muttered that Hayes would never be inaugurated. In Columbus, Ohio, a shot was fired at Hayes's residence as he sat down to dinner. After supporters marched to his home to call for the President, Hayes urged the crowd that "it is impossible, at so early a time, to obtain the result." Grant quietly strengthened the military force in and around Washington.

The Constitution provides that "the President of the Senate shall, in presence of the Senate and House of Representatives, open all the [electoral] certificates, and the votes shall then be counted." The Republicans held that the power to count the votes lay with the President of the Senate, with the House and Senate being mere spectators. The Democrats objected to that construction, since the President Pro Tempore of the Senate, the Republican Thomas W. Ferry, could then count the votes of the disputed states for Hayes.

The Democrats insisted that Congress should continue the practice followed since 1865: no vote objected to should be counted except by the concurrence of both houses. Since the House had a solid Democratic majority, rejecting the vote of one state, however, would elect Tilden.

Facing an unprecedented constitutional crisis, the Congress passed a law on January 29, 1877, to form a 15-member Electoral Commission, which would settle the result. Five members were selected from each house of Congress, and they were joined by five members of the United States Supreme Court, with William M. Evarts serving as counsel for the Republican Party. 
The majority party in each house named three members and the minority party two members. As the Republicans controlled the Senate and the Democrats controlled the House of Representatives, that yielded five Democratic and five Republican members of the commission. Of the Supreme Court justices, two Republicans and two Democrats were chosen, with the fifth to be selected by those four.

The justices first selected the independent Justice David Davis. According to one historian, "No one, perhaps not even Davis himself, knew which presidential candidate he preferred." Just as the Electoral Commission Bill was passing Congress, the Illinois Legislature elected Davis to the Senate, and Democrats in the legislature believed that they had purchased Davis's support by voting for him. However, they had miscalculated, as Davis promptly excused himself from the commission and resigned as a Justice to take his Senate seat. Since all of the remaining available Justices were Republicans, they had already selected Justice Joseph P. Bradley, who was considered the most impartial remaining member of the court. That selection proved decisive.

Since it was drawing perilously near to Inauguration Day, the commission met on January 31. Each of the disputed state election cases (Florida, Louisiana, Oregon, and South Carolina) was respectively submitted to the commission by Congress. Eminent counsel appeared for each side, and there were double sets of returns from every one of the states named.

The commission first decided not to question any returns that were prima facie lawful. Bradley then joined the other seven Republican committee members in a series of 8–7 votes that gave all 20 disputed electoral votes to Hayes, which gave Hayes a 185–184 electoral vote victory. The commission adjourned on March 2. Hayes privately took the oath of office the next day and was publicly sworn into office on March 5, 1877, and Hayes was inaugurated without disturbance.

The Compromise of 1877 might be a reason for the Democrats accepting the Electoral Commission. During intense closed-door meetings, Democratic leaders agreed reluctantly to accept Hayes as President in return for the withdrawal of federal troops from the last two Southern states that were still occupied: South Carolina and Louisiana. Republican leaders in return agreed on a number of handouts and entitlements, including federal subsidies for a transcontinental railroad line through the South. Although some of the promises were not kept, particularly the railroad proposal, that was enough for the time being to avert a dangerous standoff.

The returns accepted by the Commission put Hayes's margin of victory in South Carolina at 889 votes, the second-closest popular vote margin in a decisive state in U.S. history, after the election of 2000, which was decided by 537 votes in Florida. In 2000, the margin of victory in the Electoral College for George W. Bush was five votes, as opposed to Hayes' one vote.

Upon his defeat, Tilden said, "I can retire to public life with the consciousness that I shall receive from posterity the credit of having been elected to the highest position in the gift of the people, without any of the cares and responsibilities of the office."

Congress would eventually enact the Electoral Count Act in 1887 to provide more detailed rules for the counting of electoral votes, especially in cases of multiple slates of electors being received from a single state.

Results
According to the commission's rulings, of the 2,249 counties and independent cities making returns, Tilden won in 1,301 (57.85%), and Hayes carried only 947 (42.11%). One county (0.04%) in Nevada split evenly between Tilden and Hayes.

The Greenback ticket did not have a major impact on the election's outcome by attracting slightly under one percent of the popular vote, Cooper nonetheless had the strongest performance of any third-party presidential candidate since John Bell in 1860. The Greenbacks' best showings were in Kansas, where Cooper earned just over six percent of the vote, and in Indiana, where he earned 17,207 votes, which far exceeded Tilden's margin of victory of roughly 5,500 votes over Hayes in that state.

The election of 1876 was the last one held before the end of the Reconstruction era, which sought to protect the rights of African Americans in the South, who usually voted for Republican presidential candidates. No antebellum slave state would be carried by a Republican again until the 1896 realignment, which saw William McKinley carry Delaware, Maryland, West Virginia, and Kentucky.

No Republican presidential candidate until Warren G. Harding in 1920 would carry any states that seceded and joined the Confederacy. That year, he carried Tennessee, which had never experienced a long period of occupation by federal troops and had been completely "reconstructed" well before the first presidential election of the Reconstruction period (1868). None of the Southern states that experienced long periods of occupation by federal troops was carried by a Republican again until Herbert Hoover in 1928, when he won Texas, Florida, North Carolina, and Virginia, and that proved the last election in which the Republican candidate won Louisiana until 1956, when it was carried by Dwight D. Eisenhower, and the last in which the Republican candidate won South Carolina until 1964, when Barry Goldwater did.

The next time those two states voted against the Democrats was their support of the "Dixiecrat" candidate Strom Thurmond in 1948.

Although 1876 marked the last competitive two-party election in the South before the Democratic dominance of the South until 1948 and that to of the Border States until 1896, it was also the last presidential election (as of 2020) in which the Democrats won the wartime Unionist Mitchell County, North Carolina; Wayne County, Tennessee; Henderson County, Tennessee; and Lewis County, Kentucky. Hayes was also the only Republican president ever to be elected who failed to carry Indiana.

 

Geography of results

Cartographic gallery

Results by state
Source: Data from Walter Dean Burnham, Presidential ballots, 1836–1892 (Johns Hopkins University Press, 1955) pp 247–57.

Close states
Margin of victory less than 1% (7 electoral votes):
 South Carolina, 0.49% (889 votes) (tipping point state)Margin of victory less between 1% and 5% (164 electoral votes):
Ohio, 1.14% (7,516 votes)
Indiana, 1.26% (5,515 votes)
California, 1.80% (2,798 votes)
Florida, 1.97% (922 votes)
Pennsylvania, 2.37% (17,980 votes)
Connecticut, 2.37% (2,894 votes)
Wisconsin, 2.39% (6,141 votes)
New York, 3.22% (32,742 votes)
Louisiana, 3.30% (4,807 votes)
Oregon, 3.54% (1,057 votes)
Illinois, 3.54% (19,621 votes)
New Hampshire, 3.78% (3,030 votes)

Margin of victory between 5% and 10% (33 electoral votes):
Nevada, 5.46% (1,075 votes)
New Jersey, 5.65% (12,445 votes)
North Carolina, 7.24% (16,943 votes)
Michigan, 7.92% (25,216 votes)

Cultural references
The presidential election of 1876 is a major theme of Gore Vidal's novel 1876.

See also
 American election campaigns in the 19th century
 History of the United States (1865–1918)
 Inauguration of Rutherford B. Hayes
 1876–1877 United States House of Representatives elections
 1876–1877 United States Senate elections
 Third Party System
 Contested elections in American history

References

Sources

 Appleton's Annual Cyclopedia ...for 1876 (1885), comprehensive world coverage
 John Bigelow, Author, Edited by, Nikki Oldaker, The Life of Samuel J. Tilden. (2009 Revised edition-retype-set-new photos). 444 pages,  original 1895 edition
 Holt, Michael F. By One Vote: The Disputed Presidential Election of 1876. (2008). 304 pages, 
 
 Foley, Edward. 2016. Ballot Battles: The History of Disputed Elections in the United States. Oxford University Press.
 
 

 Huntzicker, William E. "Thomas Nast, Harper’s Weekly, and the Election of 1876." in After The War (Routledge, 2017) pp. 53-68.

 
 
 , popular account
 Summers, Mark Wahlgren.The Press Gang: Newspapers and Politics, 1865-1878 (1994)
 Summers, Mark Wahlgren. The Era of Good Stealings (1993), covers corruption 1868-1877
Richard White, "Corporations, Corruption, and the Modern Lobby: A Gilded Age Story of the West and the South in Washington, D.C." Southern Spaces, April 16, 2009
 

Primary sources

 
 Chester, Edward W A guide to political platforms (1977) online
 Porter, Kirk H. and Donald Bruce Johnson, eds. National party platforms, 1840-1964'' (1965) online 1840-1956

External links 

 Hayes Presidential Library with essays by historians
 Presidential Election of 1876: A Resource Guide from the Library of Congress
 Rutherford B. Hayes On The Election of 1876: Original Letter  Shapell Manuscript Foundation
 1876 popular vote by counties
 Hayes vs. Tilden: The Electoral College Controversy of 1876–1877
 Election of 1876 in Counting the Votes 

1876 United States presidential election
Reconstruction Era
United States
Presidency of Rutherford B. Hayes
Rutherford B. Hayes
United States
United States election controversies